Immortality is an upcoming Chinese television series based on the BL xianxia novel The Husky and His White Cat Shizun by Meatbun Doesn't Eat Meat starring Luo Yunxi and Chen Feiyu. The series is expected to air on Tencent Video with 50 episodes.

Synopsis
The story is set in a tumultuous era where the world is facing a probable invasion by the demon world due to a rift in the heavens. The world's most powerful cultivator Chu Wanning (Luo Yunxi)  did not forget his original intention of joining the world to help the Dao cultivation and sets out on a mission to protect the beings of the world. He uses his abilities to prevent the heavens from splitting and at the same time, his compassion and love influences his misguided disciple Mo Ran (Chen Feiyu) to return to the righteous path he has strayed from. Chu Wanning also successfully imparts the value of putting the greater good before personal desires to Mo Ran. In the end, the pair of teacher and disciple dedicate their lives and work together with the rest of the cultivating heroes to stop the villains' conspiracy and protect the world.

Cast

Main (in no particular order)

Supporting

Summit of Life and Death

Rufeng Sect

Production

Pre-production and filming

On January 6, 2020, CD HOME STUDIO released a casting call for the series, along with information of the participating staffs. The series is produced jointly by Tencent Penguin Pictures and Otters Studio. The series is directed by He Shupei, and the main producers are credited to be Qi Shuai, Ye Fangcang and Wang Yirong. On January 8, it was revealed that the drama has been filed on record at State Administration of Film Radio and Television (China).

The series began filming on April 24, 2020 at Hengdian World Studios.

Casting
On January 21, 2020, Luo Yunxi and Chen Feiyu were announced as the main leads.

Concept and design
A majority of the crew members, including world view design team Hua Tian, visual effects team TimeAxis, hair and makeup director Zeng Minghui and still photographer Li Ruoyu worked on 2018 fantasy romance drama Ashes of Love.  Chen Xin serves as the art director of the series, while Huang Wei is in charge of costume designs. On January 21, 2020, the concept arts designed by Hua Tian were released on the series' official weibo.

References

External website 
 Official Weibo

2020s Chinese television series
Television shows based on Chinese novels
Xianxia television series
Chinese web series
Tencent original programming
Television series by Tencent Penguin Pictures
Upcoming television series